= Channappetta =

Channappetta Pulikootil muku
- village
- Location in Kerala, India Channappetta (India)
- Coordinates: 8°53′0″N 76°57′0″E
- Country: India
- State: Kerala
- District: Kollam

Population (2011)
  - Total: 8,518

Languages
  - Official: Malayalam, English
- Time zone: UTC+5:30 (IST)
- PIN: 691311
- Telephone code: 0475
- Vehicle registration: KL-2
- Nearest city: Anchal
- Climate: adjestable since the place located with forest (Köppen)

Channappetta is a village in Kollam district in the state of Kerala, India.

== Demographics ==
As of 2011 India census, Channappetta had a population of 8,518 with 3,946 males and 4,572 females.
